Robert I (25 September 1216 – 8 February 1250), called the Good, was the first Count of Artois. He was the fifth (and second surviving) son of King Louis VIII of France and Blanche of Castile.

Life
He received Artois as an appanage, in accordance with the will of his father (died 1226) on attaining his majority in 1237 (aged twenty-one). In 1240 Pope Gregory IX, in conflict with Emperor Frederick II, offered to crown Robert as emperor in opposition to Frederick, but the French count refused to pretend to such a title.

Marriage
On 14 June 1237 Robert married Matilda, daughter of Henry II of Brabant and Marie of Hohenstaufen. 

They had two children:

 Blanche (1248–1302)
 Robert II (1250–1302), who succeeded to Artois.

Death
While participating in the Seventh Crusade, Robert died while leading a reckless attack on Al Mansurah, without the knowledge of his brother King Louis IX. After fording a river, he and a group of Knights Templars charged a Mamluk outpost, during which the Mamluk commander, Fakhr-ad-Din Yusuf, was killed. Emboldened by his success, Robert, the Templar knights, and a contingent of English troops charged into the town and became trapped in the narrow streets.  According to Jean de Joinville, Robert defended himself for some time in a house there, but was at last overpowered and killed.

References

Sources

|-

1216 births
1250 deaths
Heirs presumptive to the French throne
13th-century French people
House of Artois
Counts of Artois
French military personnel killed in action
Christians of the Sixth Crusade
Christians of the Seventh Crusade
Children of Louis VIII of France
Sons of kings